William Fitzgerald Harper (born February 8, 1980), known professionally as William Jackson Harper, is an American actor and playwright. He is best known for his role as Chidi Anagonye on the NBC comedy The Good Place (2016–2020), for which he was nominated for the Primetime Emmy Award for Outstanding Supporting Actor in a Comedy Series. In 2022, he starred in a lead role in the comedy mystery series The Resort.

Early life 
William Fitzgerald Harper was born on February 8, 1980, in Dallas, Texas. Harper grew up in Garland, Texas, and attended Lakeview Centennial High School. He graduated from the College of Santa Fe in 2003. Harper chose the stage name "William Jackson Harper" when registering for the Actors' Equity Association; most variations of "William Harper" were already in use, and he thought that "Fitzgerald" was too long. He then decided to honor his mother by using her maiden name, "Jackson", as his stage middle name.

Career 
Harper made his NY stage debut in the 2006 Vital Theatre Company production of Full Bloom, a play about teenagers coming to terms with their sexuality. In 2008 he performed in Manhattan Theatre Club's production of Lynn Nottage's play, Ruined, which won the 2009 Pulitzer Prize for Drama. From 2009 to 2011, he played Danny Rebus in the PBS series The Electric Company. In 2010 he appeared in the Public Theater's mobile unit production of Shakespeare's Measure for Measure, and in 2011 returned for Titus Andronicus, this time at the Anspacher Theater. He starred as Marty Boy in debut of The Total Bent, a musical composed by Stew and Heidi Rodewald, that premiered at The Public Theater in 2012. The show was later reworked around Ato Blankson-Wood. Harper made his Broadway debut in 2014, cast as James Harrison and Stokely Carmichael in All the Way. He and Carrie Coon co-starred in the 2015 Melissa James Gibson play, Placebo at Playwrights Horizon Theater.

In 2016, Harper was cast on the NBC comedy The Good Place. Before landing the role of Chidi Anagonye, he considered quitting acting. Harper did not learn about the show's real premise until after he was cast. His performance has received critical praise. In 2017, in between filming the show's first and second seasons, he had a leading role in Zoe Kazan's After the Blast at Lincoln Center's Claire Tow Theatre.

In 2018, Harper's play Travisville had its world premiere at Ensemble Studio Theatre. In an interview with Bloomberg News, he revealed that the play was inspired by the displacement of a poor Black community that was situated near the grounds of the Texas State Fair in Dallas. The same year, he appeared in the sci-fi film They Remain.

In 2019, he starred in two critically acclaimed films, playing Josh in the film Midsommar and James Ross in Dark Waters. Also that year, he voiced John Mercer Langston in season one of the Airship podcast 1865, which details the weeks immediately following the assassination of US President Abraham Lincoln.

It was announced in April 2020 that he would narrate the Marvel audio book series, Black Panther: Sins of the King, and in November 2020, that he would star in season 2 of the HBO Max anthology series, Love Life.

In October 2022, it was revealed that Harper joined the cast of Ant-Man and the Wasp: Quantumania, set in the Marvel Cinematic Universe. The film released into theaters on February 17, 2023.

Filmography

Film

Television

Stage
Harper has also appeared in stage productions of Ruined and An Octoroon.

Awards and nominations

References

External links
 
 

Living people
1980 births
American male television actors
Male actors from Dallas
Santa Fe University of Art and Design alumni
African-American male actors
American male film actors
21st-century African-American people
20th-century African-American people